Coastal rowing competition at the 2016 Asian Beach Games was held in Danang, Vietnam from 27 September to 1 October 2016 at Bien Dong Park.

Medalists

Men

Women

Medal table

Results

Men

Solo

Time trial
27 September

Repechage
27 September

Quarterfinals
28 September

Semifinals
28 September

Finals
28 September

Double sculls

Time trial
27 September

Repechage
27 September

Quarterfinals
29 September

Semifinals
29 September

Finals
29 September

Coxed quadruple sculls
1 October

Time trial

Heats

Semifinals

Finals

Women

Solo

Time trial
27 September

Heats
28 September

Semifinals
28 September

Finals
28 September

Double sculls

Time trial
27 September

Heats
27 September

Semifinals
29 September

Finals
29 September

Coxed quadruple sculls
1 October

Time trial

Repechage

Semifinals

Finals

References

External links 
Official website
ARF official website

2016 Asian Beach Games events
Asian Beach Games
Rowing competitions in Vietnam
Coastal rowing